The men's singles three-cushion billiards competition at the 2005 World Games took place from 20 to 24 July 2005 at the Saalbau Bottrop in Duisburg, Germany.

Last 16

Last 8

References

Three-cushion billiard - men's singles
Three-cushion billiards competitions